The Government Complex Seoul, formerly known as Central Government Complex (building) is government office building complex in Jongno, Seoul. It has one main building and two annex building. In year 2022, the Complex is used by several Ministries of South Korea, including Financial Services Commission, Ministry of the Interior and Safety and Ministry of Unification.

See also
 Government Complex, Daejeon
 Ministry of the Interior and Safety (South Korea)

References

Buildings and structures in Seoul
Buildings and structures completed in 1970
Government buildings in South Korea
Jongno District